Be the Void is the seventh album by psychedelic rock band Dr. Dog. It was released on February 7, 2012.  It is the band's second release on the ANTI- record label after moving from Park the Van, and was co-produced by Nathan Sabatino and Dr. Dog.

Album info
The band "lusted after 'the immediacy, looseness, loudness, chaos, fast tempos and dirtier' nature of their live performances, where they leave behind any 'perfectionist attitudes' in favor of spontaneous passion." Tracking for the album took place at Nathan Sabatino's Loveland Studio in Tucson, AZ as well as Dr. Dog's Meth Beach Studio in Philadelphia, PA. Mixing was completed at The Studio, Philadelphia PA by Nathan Sabatino and Dr. Dog.

Reception 

Matt Rice said in his review for VZ Magazine "Be the Void is excellent. The first track, “Lonesome,” is as perfect as folky indie gets, and the album just gets better and better as it goes on."

Track listing
All songs written by Toby Leaman and Scott McMicken.
 "Lonesome" - 3:19
 "That Old Black Hole" - 3:21
 "These Days" - 2:47
 "How Long Must I Wait?" - 3:40
 "Get Away" - 4:01
 "Do The Trick" - 4:33
 "Vampire" - 4:27
 "Heavy Light" - 3:41
 "Big Girl" - 5:03
 "Over Here, Over There" - 4:01
 "Warrior Man" - 4:58
 "Turning The Century" - 3:50

Deluxe Edition bonus tracks
 "Exit For Sale" - 5:01
 "Control Yourself" - 3:36
 "What A Fool" - 2:42

Personnel
Dr. Dog
Toby Leaman - bass, lead and backing vocals, guitar, and wurlitzer
Scott McMicken - lead guitar, lead and backing vocals, percussion, bass, keyboards, and banjo
Frank McElroy - rhythm guitar, backing vocals, lap steel guitar, and electrical sitar
Zach Miller - keyboards, pianos, organs, guitar, and backing vocals
Eric Slick - drums, percussion, secret voices, and cello
Dimitri Manos - percussion, tape loop effects, drums, and guitar

Additional Musicians
Janka Perniss - violin on "Get Away"
Nathan Sabatino - cello on "Get Away"
Sean Rogers - bass on "How Long Must I Wait?"
Forrest Reda - backing vocals on "Lonesome"

Charts

Singles:

References

External links
Dr. Dog, "Be The Void" by TeamCoCo

2012 albums
Dr. Dog albums